Ross Kinlough McGillycuddy (styled The McGillycuddy of the Reeks; 26 October 1882 – 26 April 1950) was an Irish politician. He was an independent member of Seanad Éireann from 1928 to 1936, and 1938 to 1943. He was elected at the 1928 Seanad election for 3 years, and re-elected at the 1931 Seanad election for 9 years. He served until the Free State Seanad was abolished in 1936. He was elected to the 2nd Seanad in 1938 on the Agricultural Panel and was re-elected to the 3rd Seanad.

References

External links
 

1882 births
1950 deaths
Independent members of Seanad Éireann
Irish farmers
Members of the 1928 Seanad
Members of the 1931 Seanad
Members of the 1934 Seanad
People from County Kerry
Members of the 2nd Seanad
Members of the 3rd Seanad
Irish chiefs of the name